Look Out Now! is the second album by The Gaddabouts, released in April 2012 as a double CD. The band consists of Edie Brickell, drummer Steve Gadd, guitarist Andy Fairweather Low and bass player Pino Palladino.

Development 
The album takes a casual easygoing approach that marries Brickell's laid-back songs with the skills of the seasoned session professional musicians. The album consists of a certain amount of improvisation. The first song, a one-minute tune called "Meat on Your Bones", was spontaneously written and recorded, setting a tone of not taking the recording of the music too seriously for the first few songs, aiming for loose, spontaneous, and inviting, creating a playful band dynamic. Gadd, who is the de facto bandleader, reports that the song creation process has Brickell creating songs, and the rest of the band develop the ideas, inspiring music of the others. Brickell reports that the band transforms the song into something with a lot more personality than she had conceived. Brickell found that working with The Gaddabouts inspired a joy of music creation because instead of playing a song 50 times, with the seasoned crew they could develop the song they wanted in one take, keeping everything as live as possible in the studio. Gadd had a goal of preserving the magic of first takes when developing the album.

Track listing
 Total length: 1:07:39
 All tracks written by Edie Brickell

Personnel 
The Gaddabouts
Edie Brickell – vocals, guitar
Steve Gadd – drums, percussion, vocals
Andy Fairweather Low – guitars, bass harmonica, vocals
Pino Palladino – bass, tres, guitars, vocals

Guest musicians
Ronnie Cuber – baritone saxophone, tenor saxophone, flute, bass clarinet, vocals
Larry Goldings – piano, keyboards, organ, accordion
Pedro Martínez – batá, bongos, congas, timbales, güiro, vocals
Axle Tosca – piano, vocals
Andrea Zahn – violin
Mike Mainieri – marimba, orchestra bells, vibraphone
Bob Mallory, Roy Hendrickson, Kirk Imamura, Tyler Hartman – ambient sounds, mumblings for "Horse's Mouth"
Ingrid Ingrate, Greta Kline, Lulu, Bob Mallory, Pedro Martinez, Axle Tosca, Steve Gadd, Pino Palladino, Ronnie Cuver, Andy Fairweather Low – vocals on "Corruption"

Production
Producer – Steve Gadd
Engineer, mixing, recording – Andy Smith
Mastering – Greg Calbi
Second engineers – Bob Mallory, David Rowland
Instrument technician – Mike Burns
Design and art Direction – Amy Beth McNeely
Cover painting – Jennifer Delilah

References

Edie Brickell albums
2012 albums